A soundcheck is the preparation that takes place before a concert, speech, or similar performance to adjust the sound on the venue's sound reinforcement or public address system. The performer and the audio engineers run through a small portion of the upcoming show to ensure the venue's front of house and stage monitor systems are producing clear sound, are set at the proper volume,  and have the correct mix and equalization (the latter step using the mixing console). When applied to microphones exclusively, it is more commonly (and appropriately) called a mic check.

Sound checks are especially important for rock music shows and other performances that rely heavily on sound reinforcement systems.

Processes

Soundchecks are usually conducted prior to audience entry to the venue. The soundcheck may start with the rhythm section, and then go on to the melody section and vocalists. After technical adjustments have been completed by the sound crew, the performers leave the stage and the audience is admitted. Since the acoustics of a venue often change somewhat once it is filled with audience members, the sound engineer often has to make minor modifications to the sound system settings and levels once the audience is there. 

If there is more than one artist performing, soundchecks can be more complicated.

References 

Concerts
Sound technology
Road crew